The Black Ice World Tour was a 2008–2010 concert tour by Australian rock band AC/DC, in support of their fifteenth studio album Black Ice, which was released on 20 October 2008. This tour had 8 legs around the world lasting more than 20 months starting on 26 October 2008 in Wilkes-Barre, Pennsylvania and finishing on 28 June 2010 in Bilbao, Spain.

Background

Overview
The tour was the band's first since the Stiff Upper Lip World Tour in 2000 and 2001. It was the last tour with founding member and rhythm guitarist Malcolm Young, who left the band in September 2014 due to ill health and died in November 2017. It was also the last with longtime drummer Phil Rudd, who was charged in November 2014 for hiring a hitman to murder someone and possession of drugs. They were replaced by Stevie Young and Chris Slade respectively. This was also the last full tour to feature longtime vocalist Brian Johnson, who left halfway through the Rock or Bust World Tour due to hearing problems and was replaced by Axl Rose. 

"It never gets boring," declared Johnson. "They're just the best rock band – and, just to listen to them every night, it gets me. Every time they kick in, you think, 'What the fuck?!' You're on again and you're thinking, 'This is ridiculous! I'm still grooving!'"

History
The tour began with a North American leg, kicking off in Wilkes-Barre, Pennsylvania in late October and continuing until late December. The initial leg was met with unprecedented demand, with 18 record sell-outs across the continent. A second North American leg commenced in January 2009, ultimately culminating later in the month in Nashville, Tennessee.

In February 2009, the group began their first round of European shows, beginning in Oslo and wrapping up in Birmingham, U.K. in April. One of two dates scheduled in Antwerp, Belgium was cancelled after lead singer Brian Johnson fell ill. On 29 March, the concert in Zürich, Switzerland was postponed due to undisclosed "technical difficulties" and was rescheduled for 6 April.

In May 2009, the band commenced a second European leg – all in outdoor stadiums and venues – beginning in Leipzig, Germany and ended the following month in Glasgow, Scotland.

In July 2009, the band started a third leg of North America, playing a mix of outdoor and indoor venues. The tour reached many Canadian markets that had been missed on the previous two legs. A fourth leg, which included dates in Mexico and Puerto Rico, followed in October and November. The initial six dates on the leg were postponed after Johnson underwent a medical procedure which subsequently required rest. Five of these shows were ultimately rescheduled for spring 2010; one date to be held in Phoenix, Arizona was cancelled due to a "scheduling conflict".

To Classic Rock in July 2009, Brian Johnson remarked: "We were talking about the end of the tour and I said, 'We're finishing in May and that's me done!' But Malcolm said, 'What are you talking about? We're not gonna let you retire!'"

In November and December 2009, the band headed to South America, playing shows in Brazil and Argentina. The concerts in Buenos Aires were filmed for the DVD Live at River Plate, to be released on 10 May 2011. Footage was also used in the video for "Shoot to Thrill", on the Iron Man 2 soundtrack, along with another video with footage and audio from the Buenos Aires shows of "Highway to Hell" which is also featured in the Iron Man 2 soundtrack. Earlier in November, it was falsely reported that a group of fans had issued a complaint to the band, criticising the setlist; it was merely a request to mix up the current touring setlist.

In January 2010, the group began a round of dates in New Zealand, subsequently reaching their native Australia in February. The Australian shows were the fastest selling concerts in the history of the country, with extra dates added in most markets due to demand. In early February, Johnson responded to the internet fans who had asked for a setlist change, saying "Fuck them", and that the stage show was too complicated for them to change songs easily. Following the Australian tour, which ended in Perth, Western Australia, the group played three shows in Japan.

On the Oceania tour leg from 28 January 2010 – 8 March 2010, "High Voltage" was played in tribute to Bon Scott around the 30th anniversary of his death. Scott appeared on the screen during the chorus.

In April 2010, the band returned to the United States to play the five shows rescheduled from October 2009. Later that month, Iron Man 2 – soundtrack to the film of the same name – was released. It comprised a host of the group's hits and lesser-known songs from early to recent years, and debuted at number four on the Billboard 200 album chart.

In May 2010, the band commenced a third leg of Europe, which included an appearance at the Download Festival in the U.K. "The reports that AC/DC believe their record-breaking fourth appearance at the Donington site to be their own gig, rather than part of the festival, is compounded by the fact that they've brought their own stage," remarked Classic Rock. "In Brian Johnson's grunted banter between songs there's no reference to this being anything other than another AC/DC gig, but another AC/DC gig these days is better than almost anything else you're gonna see."

In Oslo in late May, the group were forced to cut their set short due to the local curfew, after an aircraft malfunction caused a delay to the band's arrival. "For Those About to Rock (We Salute You)" was omitted from the setlist for the first time since 30 July 2003. The tour wrapped up in Bilbao, Spain at Estadio San Mamés in late June.

The tour won the "Major Tour of the Year" award at the 2009 Pollstar Concert Industry Awards. The tour was also nominated in the "Top Tour" and "Top Draw" categories at the 2009 Billboard Touring Awards. According to Billboard, the tour "has clearly tapped into a demand for AC/DC, resulting from the band's eight-year absence from touring, and takes its place as one of the band's most successful tours."

By the tour's culmination, the group had played over 160 shows to approximately 4.9 million people. It was one of history's highest grossing concert tours, grossing $441.6 million, third behind The Rolling Stones' A Bigger Bang Tour, which grossed $558.3 million in the mid-2000s, and U2's 360° Tour, which grossed $736.1 million in 2011. It dropped to fourth place after Roger Waters' The Wall Live tour when the latter ended in 2013.

Support acts

 Accept (Hanover and Stuttgart)
 Amajlija (Belgrade)
 The Answer (28 October 2008 – 8 November 2009 excl. 6 April 2009 (Zürich) and 3 June 2009 (Lisbon))
 Anvil (East Rutherford, Foxborough and Moncton)
 Audrey Horne (Oslo (30 May 2010))
 Black City (Horsens)
 Black Frog (Milwaukee)
 Blake (Helsinki)
 The Blizzards (Naas)
 Boon (Wels and Hanover)
 Broken Spurs (Louisville)
 Bullet (Gothenburg)
 Héroes Del Asfalto (Buenos Aires)
 Café Bertrand (Marseille and Paris (12 June 2009))
 Calling All Cars (11 February–8 March 2010)
 The Checks (Wellington and Auckland)
 Claudia Cane Band (13–24 May 2009)
 Drive Like Maria (Amsterdam)
 Dżem (Warsaw)
 The Floor Is Made of Lava (Copenhagen)
 Hardcore Superstar (Stockholm (3 June 2010))
 Héroes del Asfalto (Buenos Aires)
 Down (Bucharest)
 Kaiser Franz Josef (Wels)
 Killing Machine (Nice and Paris (18 June 2010))
 Killswitch Engage ((Download Festival))
 Конкурент (Sofia)
 Krokus (Bern)
 Las Pelotas (Buenos Aires)
 The Last Vegas (Des Moines)
 Los Perros del Boogie (Seville and Bilbao (28 June 2010))
 Megaphone (Orlando)
 Mil Muertos (San Juan)
 Mundo Cão (Lisbon)
 Mustang (Mexico City)
 Nasi (São Paulo)
 The New Black (Stuttgart and Dresden)
 Redwood (Zürich)
 Room77 (Stuttgart)
 Shaman's Harvest (Kansas City (15 April 2010))
 Shihad (Wellington and Auckland)
 Skambankt (Oslo (16 June 2009))
 Slash (Paris (18 June 2010))
 Maurizio Solieri (Udine)
 The Subways (London (26 June 2009) and Glasgow)
 Jonathan Tyler and the Northern Lights (El Paso)
 Them Crooked Vultures  (Download 2010))
 Le Vibrazioni (Udine)
 The Vicious Five (Lisbon)
 Volbeat (Wels, Dresden and Berlin)
 Wolfmother (11 February–8 March 2010)
 Zero Nine (Tampere)

Setlist

 "Rock 'N Roll Train"
 "Hell Ain't a Bad Place to Be"
 "Back in Black"
 "Big Jack"
 "Dirty Deeds Done Dirt Cheap"
 "Shot Down in Flames"[a]
 "Thunderstruck"
 "Black Ice"[f]
 "The Jack"
 "Hells Bells"
 "Shoot to Thrill"[b]
 "War Machine"[f]
 "Dog Eat Dog"[c]
 "Anything Goes"[e]
 "High Voltage"[d]
 "You Shook Me All Night Long"
 "T.N.T."
 "Whole Lotta Rosie"
 "Let There Be Rock"

Encore
  "Highway to Hell"
 "For Those About to Rock (We Salute You)"[f]

Notes

Tour dates

Cancelled dates

Personnel
Brian Johnson – lead vocals
Angus Young – lead guitar
Malcolm Young – rhythm guitar, backing vocals
Cliff Williams – bass guitar, backing vocals
Phil Rudd – drums

See also
List of highest-grossing concert tours

Notes

References

AC/DC concert tours
2008 concert tours
2009 concert tours
2010 concert tours